Platyptilia censoria is a moth of the family Pterophoridae. It is known from Mauritius in the Indian Ocean.

References

censoria
Endemic fauna of Mauritius
Moths of Mauritius
Moths described in 1910